The Turbo Touch 360 is a series of aftermarket third-party controllers made by Triax for the Nintendo Entertainment System, Super Nintendo Entertainment System, and Sega Genesis (the latter version also being compatible with Atari and Commodore systems). The Turbo Touch 360 was first shown off at the  International Consumer Electronics Show in late 1993, but the controller never replaced the D-Pad in later consoles because it was reported to be overly sensitive and uncomfortable to use.

Design and functionality

Whereas most controllers used a D-pad with mechanical switches, the Turbo Touch had an octagonal plate with eight capacitive touch sensors arranged in the cardinal directions; contrary to the "360" name, the controller only provided digital input along the cardinal directions. The idea was that the controller could be operated with less physical force, reducing thumb injuries and "numb thumb", thereby improving player comfort and health. The controller was endorsed by Dr. Robert Grossman, an orthopedic surgeon specializing in sports injuries.
 
Other than the touchpad, the controllers have a standard set of features typical for controllers of the time, with turbo support.

Reception
The controller was ranked the ninth worst video game controller by IGN editor Craig Harris.

References

Unlicensed Nintendo hardware
Nintendo Entertainment System accessories
Super Nintendo Entertainment System accessories
Sega Genesis